Liceo Técnico Felisa Clara Tolup Zeiman is a Chilean high school located in San Fernando, Colchagua Province, Chile.

References 

Educational institutions established in 1949
Secondary schools in Chile
Schools in Colchagua Province
1949 establishments in Chile